Nuno Miguel Teixeira da Rocha (born 1 March 1977) is a Portuguese retired footballer who played as an attacking midfielder.

Club career
Rocha was born in Porto. During his career, spent mainly in the lower leagues, he represented C.D. Trofense (two spells, the first of those in the fourth division), F.C. Paços de Ferreira, Leça FC, Académica de Coimbra, Vilanovense FC, S.C. Braga, C.D. Santa Clara, G.D. Chaves, Gondomar SC, Varzim S.C. and Aliados Lordelo FC.

With Braga, from 2002 to 2004, he appeared in 23 Primeira Liga matches, five of those coming in the second season against the Big Three – three late substitute appearances, three 2–0 away losses; he had previously made his competition debut with Leça, in early 1998.

References

External links

1977 births
Living people
Portuguese footballers
Footballers from Porto
Association football midfielders
Primeira Liga players
Liga Portugal 2 players
Segunda Divisão players
C.D. Trofense players
F.C. Paços de Ferreira players
Leça F.C. players
Associação Académica de Coimbra – O.A.F. players
S.C. Braga B players
S.C. Braga players
C.D. Santa Clara players
G.D. Chaves players
Gondomar S.C. players
Varzim S.C. players